Joseph Levine (born January 17, 1952) is an American philosopher at the University of Massachusetts Amherst who received his PhD from Harvard University in 1981.

He works on philosophy of mind and is best known for formulating the explanatory gap argument against a materialist explanation for consciousness. This has been cited as a precursor to David Chalmers's formulation of the hard problem of consciousness and as one of the main objections materialist theories in philosophy of mind must address. The idea of the explanatory gap is that an unbridgeable gap exists when trying to comprehend consciousness from the perspective of natural science, as a scientific explanation of mental states would require a reduction from a physical process to phenomenal experience. The property of mental states to be experienced from a subjective point of view (qualia) might not be reducible from the objective, i.e. outside, perspective of science. In this sense there would be a gap between the outside perspective of science and the internal perspective of phenomenal experience. Levine does not believe this gap necessitates a metaphysical conclusion; that is, he does not believe his argument refutes materialism. But he believes it poses a unique epistemic problem:

While I think this materialist response is right in the end, it does not suffice to put the mind-body problem to rest. Even if conceivability considerations do not establish that the mind is in fact distinct from the body, or that mental properties are metaphysically irreducible to physical properties, still they do demonstrate that we lack an explanation of the mental in terms of the physical.

Levine is the author of popular and academic philosophy books and articles.

Personal life

Joseph Levine is married to fellow philosopher Louise Antony and is the father of Bay Area musician Rachel Lark.

See also

 Thomas Nagel
 John Searle
 Frank Jackson
 Colin McGinn

References

Links 
 Homepage of Joseph Levine, University of Massachusetts, Amherst, with bibliography

1952 births
20th-century American philosophers
21st-century American philosophers
Analytic philosophers
American consciousness researchers and theorists
Harvard University alumni
Living people
Materialists
Metaphysicians
Philosophers of language
Philosophers of mind
University of Massachusetts Amherst faculty